Ndaba is a given name. It may refer to:

Ndaba Dube (born 1959), Zimbabawean boxer
Ndaba kaMageba, King of the Zulu from 1745 to 1763
Ndaba Mandela (born 1982), author, entrepreneur, political consultant. Grandson of Nelson Mandela
Ndaba Mhlongo (1933-1989), South African actor, comedian, director, choreographer
Ndaba Machobane (born 1990), Lesotho Farmer and Business owners

See also
Ndabazinhle Mdhlongwa (born 1973), Zimbabwean triple jumper
Ndama, people with the given name or surname